Gervys Rignold Hazlitt, commonly known as Gerry (4 September 1888 – 30 October 1915), was an Australian cricketer who played in nine Test matches from 1907 to 1912.

A right-arm medium-pace and off-spin bowler and useful lower-order batsman, Hazlitt toured England with the Australian team in 1912. In his last Test, against England at The Oval, he took 7 for 25 in the second innings. In his first Test, against England at Sydney in 1907–08, he made 34 not out and put on 56 for the ninth wicket in 39 minutes with Tibby Cotter to give Australia victory by two wickets.

He played for Victoria from 1905–06 to 1910–11, then moved to Sydney to take up a position teaching at The King's School, Parramatta, and played for Central Cumberland District Cricket Club and New South Wales in 1911–12 and 1912–13.

Gerry is famous as a man who produced a stunning finish to his test career. In his last match, the last match of the one and only Triangular Tournament, in England in 1912 he bowled cutters to good effect on a rain-affected track at The Oval, London and took 5 wickets for 1 run in his last 17 balls to finish with career-best figures of 7 for 25 in 21.4 overs. However England won the match by 244 runs to take the triangular series, that also included South Africa. Australia did not play another Test until after the First World War, by which time Hazlitt had died.
Born with a weak heart, Hazlitt died after suffering a heart attack in 1915, aged 27.

References

External links

1888 births
1915 deaths
Australia Test cricketers
New South Wales cricketers
Victoria cricketers
Melbourne Cricket Club cricketers
People educated at Haileybury (Melbourne)
Australian cricketers
Cricketers from Sydney